Muscel County is a former first-order administrative district of Romania. It was located in the southern central part of Greater Romania, in the northwestern part of the historic region of Muntenia. Its territory is now mostly part of Argeș County, while some communes (Malu cu Flori, Pucheni and Văleni-Dâmbovița) now belong to Dâmbovița County. The county seat was Câmpulung.

The county was bordered on the west by Argeș County, to the north by the counties of Făgăraș and Brașov, and to the east by Dâmbovița County. 

In 1938, the county was disestablished and incorporated into the newly-formed Ținutul Argeș, but it was re-established in 1940 after the fall of Carol II's regime - only to be abolished on 6 September 1950 by the Communist regime.

Administrative organization

Administratively, Muscel County was originally divided into two districts (plăși): 
Plasa Podgoria
Plasa Radu-Negru

Subsequently a third district was established:
Plasa Râul Doamnei

By 1938, the county was divided administratively into six districts:
Plasa Argeșel
Plasa Dâmbovița
Plasa Podgoria
Plasa Râul Doamnei
Plasa Râurile
Plasa Golești

Population 
According to the 1930 census data, the county population was 149,797 inhabitants, ethnically divided as follows: 97.1% Romanians, 2.3% Romanies, 0.2% Hungarians, as well as other minorities. From the religious point of view, 99.3% Orthodox, 0.3% Roman Catholic, as well as other minorities.

Urban population 
In 1930, the county's urban population was 13,868 inhabitants, ethnically divided as follows: 95.4% Romanians, 1.2% Hungarians, 0.9% Romanies, 0.5% Germans, as well as other minorities. From the religious point of view, the urban population was composed of 95.8% Eastern Orthodox, 2.2% Roman Catholic, 0.6% Reformed (Calvinist), 0.4% Evangelical (Lutheran), 0.3% Baptist, 0.2% Greek Catholic, as well as other minorities.

Industry
A paper factory (Câmpulungul S. A.)  functioned within the county seat, the town of Câmpulung, as of 1931.

References

External links

  Muscel County on memoria.ro

Former counties of Romania
Wallachia
1950 disestablishments in Romania
1859 establishments in Romania
States and territories disestablished in 1950
States and territories established in 1859
1938 disestablishments in Romania
1940 establishments in Romania
States and territories disestablished in 1938
States and territories established in 1940